The Coronado Area Council is the local council of the Boy Scouts of America (BSA) that serves Scouts in north central and northwest Kansas, across 32 counties, with headquarters in Salina.

Organization

The council headquarters is located in Salina, Kansas and the council is organized into five districts.

 Triconda District, encompassing Saline, Ellsworth, Lincoln, Ottawa, Cloud, Mitchell, and Republic counties and the city of Abilene in Dickinson county.
 Konza District: Dickinson, Geary, Morris, Clay, Washington and Riley counties
 Wheatland District: Russell, Ellis, Trego, Osborne, Rooks and Gove counties
 Tomahawk District: Graham, Norton, Decatur, Sheridan, Phillips, Smith and Jewell counties
 Buffalo Bill District: Sherman, Cheyenne, Wallace, Thomas, Rawlins, and Logan counties

Dane G. Hansen Scout Reservation

Dane G. Hansen Scout Reservation, often called Camp Hansen, is the Coronado Area Council's summer Scout camp, located two miles south-southwest of Kirwin, Kansas.

Tribe of the Golden Eagle
The Coronado Area Council operates a leadership program, the Tribe of Golden the Eagle at Camp Hansen. The program was inspired by the Pony Express Council and Heart of America Council's Tribe of Mic-O-Say. Membership is indicated by the wearing of replica eagle claws, with the number of claws and the paint on the tips of the claws indicating rank within the tribe.

Kidi Kidsh Lodge

The Kidi Kidsh Lodge is the Coronado Area Council lodge in the Order of the Arrow, the national Boy Scout honor society.

See also
Scouting in Kansas

References

Local councils of the Boy Scouts of America
Central Region (Boy Scouts of America)
Youth organizations based in Kansas